The Darlington and Barnard Castle Railway, (also known as the D&BCR) was an east–west railway line that connected Darlington and Barnard Castle in County Durham, England. Besides the main running line, it had two branches that headed south into Yorkshire that were only used for freight. The former Merrybent freight branch is now used as part of the A1(M) road that bypasses to the west of Darlington.

History
The line was authorised by an Act of Parliament in 1854 and opened up to traffic in July 1856. The act had been through Parliament in the 18th century with the route been designated as a canal with branches south into Yorkshire. The railway proposal had been through the process of approval once before and was rejected due to local landowner opposition. A further act of 1858, subsumed the company into the Stockton & Darlington Railway.

During the construction period, heavy rains in October 1855 swept away two bridges being built over the River Tees by the contractors. The line was engineered by Thomas Bouch for £120,000.

The line was originally single track from the junction at Hopetown, west of  station, and was worked in one section by staff and ticket to Barnard Castle.  After the Forcett Branch opened in 1867 (see below) the section from Hopetown to Piercebridge was doubled (the contract being let in May 1869). The line from Piercebridge to Forcett Junction was doubled the following year. Thereafter it was single to Barnard Castle; the section from Broomielaw to Barnard Castle was doubled in 1896, and at the same time a passing place was constructed at Winston. Piercebridge and Winston stations had two platforms, whereas  and Broomielaw only had one platform each. The original station at Barnard Castle was closer to the town, but because of the distance between the original station and the one further north on the SD&LUR line, all passenger trains were concentrated on the second site which was a through site rather than the original terminus. The original station was then used as a goods facility, though, as it was no longer servicing passengers, the portico from the station entrance was moved to Saltburn Valley Gardens in 1867 as part of a memorial to Prince Albert. The line was single through Broomielaw with a junction to provide double track at the western end of the station area. The station at Broomielaw was a private halt for the owners of the nearby Streatlam Castle. The station was declared public in 1936 but did not appear in the LNER Timetable until June 1942.

The three original intermediate stations of Piercebridge, Winston and Gainford all had a single-storey station cottage designed by William Bryson who worked under Thomas Bouch. Between 1867 and 1874, all of these cottages were extended to have an upper floor.

When the SD&LUR line opened in 1863, this practice ceased as the SD&LUR provided a more direct route. The triangle at Stooperdale was used to turn locomotives that were arriving or departing from the adjacent locomotive works.

A one-road engine shed was provided at Barnard Castle in 1865. This was extended in 1875 into two roads and by the time of the grouping in 1923, had an allocation of seven engines. The shed closed in 1937.

Traffic on the line increased during the Second World War with numerous training camps being built in the Barnard Castle area. Troops and tanks were offloaded at Barnard Castle and Broomielaw stations. The station crane in Barnard Castle goods station was destroyed after a tank was accidentally driven off one of the wagons in the yard and crushed the crane.

The whole line through Barnard Castle to Middleton-in-Teesdale closed to passengers in November 1964. The line between Forcett Junction and Barnard Castle was closed in April 1965, with the rest of the branch closing in May 1966.

Stations

Forcett and Merrybent branches

The branch did not open until February 1867, and even then was delayed in forwarding traffic as the track had not been ballasted properly or been engineered correctly. The line was worked by the NER but retained its independence until the grouping of 1923, when it became an LNER asset.

The  Merrybent Railway was built to convey copper, lead and limestone for the Merrybent and Middleton Tyas Mining and Smelting Company. The branch line was authorised by an act of Parliament in 1866, opened in 1870 but it closed in 1878 due to financial difficulties. The NER purchased the line in 1890 and re-opened it soon afterwards. It continued to forward aggregate from the quarries around Barton until 1950 when it was closed for the final time. A station and platform were provided at Barton for the use of non-aggregate goods workings, and although intended for eventual use by passengers, the station at Barton never sold a ticket. The trackbed of the former railway was adapted into the northern carriageway of the A1(M) bypass around Darlington in 1965 with the defunct quarry at Barton being used as a motorway interchange.

Accidents
On 24 October 1905, a train from Darlington bound for Tebay had just left Gainford station when it derailed and slid down an embankment. Injuries were only slight, so a recovery operation was launched immediately as a Royal Train was due on the line later on the same day. The cause of the accident was due to several factors; a trackworking gang had removed a rail from the running line after misreading the timetable and not expecting the train to be there. The drivers of both locomotives (two were necessary for the ascent over Stainmore Pass) did not see the signals at danger and the explosives, left on the line by the trackworking gang to warn of danger ahead, did not detonate.

Notes

References

Sources

Coulthard, Robin & Teasdale, John (2018). Lesser Railways Around Darlington - Fighting Cocks, Croft Depot, Forcett and Merrybent Branches. North Eastern Railway Association. ISBN 9781911360131

External links

Image of Stooperdale Junction (bottom right), image looking south with D&BCR on the right

1856 establishments in England
1966 disestablishments in England
Rail transport in County Durham
North Eastern Railway (UK)
Railway lines opened in 1856
Railway companies disestablished in 1858
Stockton and Darlington Railway
Railway lines closed in 1966
British companies disestablished in 1858
British companies established in 1856